Giant Bomb is an American video game website and wiki that includes personality-driven gaming videos, commentary, news, and reviews, created by former GameSpot editors Jeff Gerstmann and Ryan Davis. The website was voted by Time magazine as one of the Top 50 websites of 2011. Originally part of Whiskey Media, the website was acquired by CBS Interactive in March 2012 before being sold to Red Ventures in 2020, then to Fandom in 2022.

After being terminated from his position as editorial director of GameSpot, Gerstmann began working with a team of web engineers to create a new video game website. His intent was to create "a fun video game website" that would not heavily cover the business side of the game industry. The site's core editorial staff consisted primarily of former GameSpot editors. Giant Bomb was unveiled on March 6, 2008, as a blog; the full site launched on July 21, 2008. The Giant Bomb offices were originally in Sausalito, California before moving to San Francisco in 2010, with a second office established in New York City in 2014. Following the COVID-19 pandemic in 2020, both offices were closed and the website permanently shifted to a remote work environment.

Content on Giant Bomb comes from the site's staff as well as its community, which contributes to the site's video game wiki database that is open to editing by all registered users. The Giant Bomb staff covers video game news and new releases in the form of video, written articles, and podcasts. Their weekly podcast, the Giant Bombcast, is posted on Tuesdays, and covers the video game industry as well as happenings around the office. Giant Bomb produces a number of regular video series including Quick Looks, 20-90 minute unedited looks at recently released games.

History

GameSpot departures, origins under Whiskey Media (2007–2011)
Jeff Gerstmann was terminated from his position as the editorial director of GameSpot on November 28, 2007. After his termination, rumors began to circulate around the Internet that his dismissal was a result of external pressure from Eidos Interactive, the publisher behind the video game Kane & Lynch: Dead Men. Gerstmann had given the game a negative review while Eidos had purchased advertising for the game on the website. Both GameSpot and their parent company CNET Networks stated that his dismissal was unrelated to the review. In what was labelled as the "GameSpot Exodus" by Joystiq, Alex Navarro, Ryan Davis, Brad Shoemaker, and Vinny Caravella all left GameSpot. Davis announced his departure from GameSpot in February 2008, citing Gerstmann's firing as one of his reasons for leaving.

Gerstmann ultimately decided he did not wish to work in game development or public relations and began to work with Shelby Bonnie's Whiskey Media to begin developing a new site. Talking with Tyler Wilde of GamesRadar, Gerstmann said that their intent was not to make a site that would compete with GameSpot, but rather create "a really great and fun video game website ... that we like and that we would use, and that users will have a blast using as well." In the process of deciding on the name for the website, over seventy different domain names were considered. Gerstmann wanted the website name to be catchy and original, saying there were too many video game websites with the word "game" in them. Giant Bomb started as a WordPress blog, which opened on March 5, 2008. The full site launched on July 20, 2008. In addition to Davis, who recorded early episodes of the site's podcast, the Giant Bombcast, with Gerstmann, former GameSpot editors Shoemaker and Caravella joined the site in June 2008. In November 2008, Drew Scanlon became one of Giant Bombs first interns, later being officially hired as a video producer the following year. Navarro left his post as Community manager for Harmonix Music Systems to join Giant Bomb and its sister-site Screened in May 2010.

Unlike most video game websites, Giant Bomb does not heavily cover industry news from a business perspective. During an interview on X-Play, Gerstmann said that he thought video game websites had become too focused on the business side of games, and that game news had become "stale" in the process. "We want to get out there and talk about games, because we like games ... and it seems like there's an audience out there, and they like games ... and their needs aren't being met by what's out there right now."

After working for 1UP.com, MTV News, G4, and Electronic Gaming Monthly, video game reporter Patrick Klepek made contact with Giant Bomb in October 2010 regarding Klepek's desire to work for the site. Klepek, known for breaking the story of the 2010 employee firings, departures, and lawsuits between Infinity Ward and Activision cited the website as "the singular bastion of a truly independent voice" in video game journalism. In 2011, Gerstmann commented that the industry was now "not getting as much news from the news sites as [it] used to, but the post count from these sites just seems to go higher and higher." In order to establish its own brand of "honest, original reporting" news, Giant Bomb hired Klepek as News Editor in April 2011.

Acquisition by CBS Interactive (2012)
March 2012 saw Shelby Bonnie sell Whiskey Media in two deals, splitting the company's websites. Gail Berman and Lloyd Braun's BermanBraun bought the company, its publishing platform, and websites Tested, Screened, and Anime Vice. Giant Bomb and its comic-book sister-site Comic Vine were sold separately to CBS Interactive, the owners of GameSpot and its parent company CNET. Following the sale of the publishing platform to BermanBraun, the site was rebuilt. The redesigned site launched on February 12, 2013.

Gerstmann explained that behind the scenes Giant Bomb had been looking for new ownership in order to facilitate the website's growth and that talks between themselves and CBS Interactive had started as far back as December 2011. Staying in San Francisco, the Giant Bomb and Comic Vine editorial staff, along with designers Dave Snider and Alexis Gallisá, moved to the CBS Interactive building where Gerstmann, Davis, Shoemaker, and Caravella had worked for GameSpot.

As part of the new deal, the non-disparagement agreement between Gerstmann and CNET was nullified, allowing Gerstmann to openly talk about the reason why he was fired from GameSpot in 2007. In an interview with GameSpot, Gerstmann revealed that the firing was a result of a longer stand-off between GameSpot then-management division and its editorial staff. Gerstmann had been "called into a room" three times between October 23, 2007, and November 29, 2007. The first time concerned a reviewer's scoring of 7.5 for Ratchet & Clank Future: Tools of Destruction, for which Sony Computer Entertainment America had threatened to pull advertising money. The second concerned Gerstmann's 6.0 Kane & Lynch: Dead Men review, which provoked further threats by Eidos Interactive. On the third call, some time after the release of the review, Gerstmann was informed that his contract was terminated.

Davis' death and tribute, new hires, departures, and expansion (2013–2016)
In July 2013, the site revealed that co-founder and long-time fixture of the website, Ryan Davis, died July 3, 2013, at age 34, days after his wedding to Anna Davis. Davis's father Richard Davis confirmed that the death was of natural causes.

The gaming industry paid tribute to Davis through social media, written articles, and video. Gary Whitta, Michael Pachter, Sean Vanaman, and Greg Miller were among the prominent names to voice their thoughts on Davis's death. During the recording of that week's episode of Bonus Round for GameTrailers, Geoff Keighley hosted a memorial episode dedicated to Davis's death along with guests Pachter, Jessica Chobot, and Kyle Bosman. The German musician C418, known for his work on the Minecraft soundtrack, released "Taswell", a musical tribute to Davis.

Giant Bomb announced two opening vacancies in 2014 for senior editor and video producer positions. At the same time, Caravella announced that he was moving from San Francisco to his home-town in New York following the birth of his second child. In addition to the two new staff members, Caravella and Navarro would open a new studio in CBS Interactive's New York offices. The reasoning for expansion stemmed from having the two offices recording simultaneously to increase the variety of content and subsequently not competing for studio time and people, while also giving the opportunity for the new staff members to establish themselves and freshen up the content being made in San Francisco. The new hires were announced as Game Informer staff members Dan Ryckert and Jason Oestreicher, who had worked at Game Informer since 2009 and 2011 respectively.

In December 2014, Klepek announced his departure from the website. In his final post, Klepek thanked the staff and the Giant Bomb community, saying "Until Giant Bomb, I held a devil-may-care attitude about my employment, and no place kept my attention very long. It's not to suggest I've never cared about my work before Giant Bomb, but I never loved where I worked until strolling into the Whiskey Media offices back in 2011." Klepek later announced that he would be joining Kotaku as a senior reporter.

In May 2015, Austin Walker joined the editorial team at Giant Bomb, working out of the New York offices alongside Caravella and Navarro. Walker announced his departure from the website in June 2016 to become the editor-in-chief for Waypoint, later hiring fellow Giant Bomb alumnus Klepek as well. In September 2016, Ryckert announced he would be permanently relocating to the New York office at the start of the new year, with a new hire scheduled to join the San Francisco office in the following months.

Scanlon, blinking white guy meme, and departure (2017–2019)
A GIF image of video producer Drew Scanlon, nicknamed the "Blinking White Guy" GIF, became an Internet meme in February 2017 after becoming viral on Twitter. The reaction GIF, which originated from an episode of the video series Unprofessional Fridays in 2013, was noted by Mashable for its versatility in being used as a reaction in tweets. The meme has resulted in multiple tweets accruing hundreds of thousands of retweets and likes while Cosmopolitan magazine called it "the most relatable meme ever". In interviews with BuzzFeed and The Guardian, Scanlon commented on his approval of the meme and noted how people separate the real person behind it, saying "I do feel fairly removed."

That same week, San Francisco Chronicles SF Gate website reported that Scanlon had announced that he was leaving Giant Bomb at the end of the month. Going into more detail on the Giant Bombcast, Scanlon explained his intention to begin a Patreon-funded solo documentary project titled "Cloth Map" and joked with Gerstmann about the timing of the blinking meme going viral coinciding with his announcement, despite informing his colleagues of the decision weeks before. On May 1, 2017, Giant Bomb announced that Abby Russell and former intern Ben Pack would be joining the Giant Bomb East and West offices respectively, with additional hires planned for later in the year. In November 2017 the site announced that a new video producer, Jan Ochoa, had taken the seat vacated by Scanlon.

Remote work, acquisition by Red Ventures, Nextlander departures, and new contractors (2020–2021)
In January 2020, Dan Ryckert announced his departure from the site, having accepted a position as a podcast producer for WWE. The following March, both offices were closed in response to the COVID-19 pandemic, forcing the staff to work remotely from their homes. In September 2020, ViacomCBS announced the sale of CNET and related websites to the Red Ventures marketing firm for 500 million. Jeff Gerstmann later confirmed that Giant Bomb was among the sites included in the sale. The following October, Abby Russell announced that she would be departing the site at the end of November 2020. In January 2021, Ben Pack announced he would be leaving the site after the Game of the Year discussions concluded later that month. The same month, longtime Giant Beastcast co-host Jeff Bakalar of CNET was named Head of Content Development and Strategy for Giant Bomb.

In May 2021, Vinny Caravella, Alex Navarro, and Brad Shoemaker announced that they were leaving the site, effectively leading to the closure of the New York studio. The three later established a new podcast and streaming project, "Nextlander", the following month, gaining over 5000 Patreon subscribers within its first day of activity. In a statement made to GameSpot following the departures, Gerstmann confirmed that they would be "using this as an opportunity to rethink what this site is. It’s a chance to introduce new personalities from different backgrounds and explore categories and topics that [Giant Bomb] never have before." On the June 8, 2021, episode of the Giant Bombcast, Giant Bomb confirmed that in addition to hiring new on-camera and production staff, multiple others who had appeared as guests in previous Giant Bomb content would be joining as contractors and contributing new shows and content, including Danny O'Dwyer of Noclip; Jeff Grubb of VentureBeat; Tamoor Hussain and Lucy James of GameSpot; Evil Uno of All Elite Wrestling; actors Matt Shipman and Janina Gavankar; and Giant Bomb alumni Ryckert and Pack. In October 2021, Giant Bomb announced that YouTube video producer Jess O'Brien, who had been assisting Giant Bomb in a contractor role, would be joining the site as a full-time employee. Gerstmann confirmed in a later episode of the Giant Bombcast that the San Francisco office would be closing and the site would be permanently shifting to a remote work environment.

Gerstmann's firing, reorganization, and acquisition by Fandom (2022–present)
On June 6, 2022, Giant Bomb announced Jeff Gerstmann's departure from the website. The following day, Gerstmann confirmed he would be starting a new independent podcast, "The Jeff Gerstmann Show", funded via Patreon. Gerstmann elaborated in the podcast's first episode later that day that the decision to leave Giant Bomb was a result of feeling overly stressed and creatively stifled by the increasing bureaucracy and time spent on business and management while working under a corporation, coupled with a desire to spend more time focusing on the actual production of content and the discussion of games and the industry. Gerstmann elaborated further in the October 25th episode of the podcast, stating that he "got fired three weeks before [he] was going to quit;" while uncertain as to the exact circumstances surrounding his dismissal, he noted that he had become disillusioned at that time, as it had become clear that his goals for the website would not be possible under their parent company.

On the same day as Gerstmann's podcast began, Giant Bomb announced a reorganization focused on a core crew of nine personalities. In addition to Rorie, Oestreicher, Ochoa, Bakalar and O'Brien, Tamoor Hussain and Lucy James would be joining Giant Bomb while also remaining part of GameSpot editorial team, with Jeff Grubb joining the site full time and producing a daily news show, Game Mess Mornings, as well. Former editor Dan Ryckert would also be returning to the site, now in a creative director position. On October 3, 2022, Fandom, Inc. announced that they had acquired multiple entertainment websites from Red Ventures, including Giant Bomb. On January 19, 2023, several employees of various Fandom websites were laid off, including Oestricher and O'Brien. On the March 14 episode of the Giant Bombcast, Matthew Rorie announced he would be departing the site at the end of the week.

Main features
Giant Bombs editorial content is described as lighter and looser than the traditional news and review video game websites, focusing on video content with the intent of being humorous and entertaining.

Video

Giant Bomb videos are currently produced by Ochoa. Videos are hosted on Giant Bomb and non-paywall videos are also available via YouTube and as a free channel on digital media streaming devices such as Roku. This Ain't No Game (TANG) was a weekly series throughout 2009 in which Davis would review movies based on video games, based on Davis' intention to, "challenge [himself] to watch and assess every video-game movie ever made". The name of the series was taken from the marketing tagline for the Super Mario Bros. movie. Despite TANG criticizing the film Mortal Kombat: Annihilation, Mortal Kombat co-creator Ed Boon said the episode in question was kind to it, considering its critical response.

The Endurance Run was a daily video feature in which Caravella and Gerstmann played the PlayStation 2 role-playing game Persona 4 in real time, with their own commentary over the video. The idea for the Endurance Run stemmed from Gerstmann and Caravella's own interest in playing Persona 4, a game they were both curious about but didn't have time to play. In 2010 Gerstmann, Caravella, Davis, and Shoemaker split into teams and concurrently played through the Xbox 360 budget action-adventure game Deadly Premonition. After the show ended, Deadly Premonition creator Hidetaka "SWERY" Suehiro visited Giant Bomb in 2011 and 2013. Speaking at sister-site Tested.com's 2011 24-hour charity podcast in aid of Child's Play, Davis and Klepek revealed themselves as the players of the 3rd Endurance Run, playing the Super Nintendo Entertainment System release of Chrono Trigger. The feature went on hiatus for four years until the PAX West event in September 2016, where Caravella, Navarro, and Ryckert announced they would be reviving the Endurance Run feature, playing through the Dreamcast game Shenmue.

Thursday Night Throwdown was a live weekly multiplayer show. Members of the editorial team played a game with and for users to watch and interact via Twitch. Tim Schafer and Double Fine was in attendance for the episode featuring Iron Brigade (which was then known as Trenched). Preceding the release of the 2011 video game Bastion was the video diary series Building the Bastion, a collaboration with Giant Bomb and the creators of Bastion, Supergiant Games. Documented events featured include the in-house development of the game, public showings at PAX Prime 2011 and eventually gaining Warner Bros. as a publishing partner. Giant Bomb chose not to review the game.

In December 2011, prior to the launch of Star Wars: The Old Republic, the website streamed Star Wars Galaxies during its final 5 hours before being shut down. Kotaku reported events as they happened on the Giant Bomb stream, including a player versus player event between the Star Wars factions the Galactic Empire and The Rebels, as well as an appearance from the Force Ghost of Obi-Wan Kenobi as depicted in The Empire Strikes Back and Return of the Jedi.

Quick Look
The site regularly posts Quick Looks, 20-90 minute videos showing unedited gameplay footage of a single game, featuring uncensored commentary from staff members playing the game, or watching others play. Video game YouTube celebrity John "TotalBiscuit" Bain, who modelled his own video series WTF is... after Quick Looks, describes this new video format as a mix of both entertainment and critique, combined with the essence of a Let's Play video. The feature has been used to profile highly anticipated games, give mention to lesser-known games, or to intentionally showcase bad games for humorous purposes. Quick Looks by Giant Bomb of lesser-known games are often more publicized by their respective developers or communities, such as the fighting game community, as a sign of mainstream recognition. In covering Quick Looks, Dave LeClair of MakeUseOf focused on the format only on the entertainment merit of the Giant Bomb staff playing a given game, citing Quick Looks of Euro Truck Simulator 2, Wipeout: The Game, and the Trains Vs Zombies downloadable content of RailWorks 3 as games LeClair had no interest in playing but recommended as fun viewing in a Quick Look.

Podcasts
In April 2012, video game localization company 8-4 announced that they would be entering a partnership with Giant Bomb in which the website would become the new host for the bi-weekly 8-4 podcast. In September 2014 it was announced that Giant Bomb had entered into a partnership with Midroll, a podcast advertisement company.

Giant Bombcast

The Giant Bombcast is Giant Bombs weekly podcast, released on Tuesdays.  the show is currently hosted by Ochoa, with other members of the staff rotating as guests each week. Nicholson Baker of The New Yorker described the podcast as "charmingly garrulous" and compared it with Car Talk in 2011, with The A.V. Club also commenting on it during its review in 2012 as "resembling a conversation among gaming enthusiasts listeners are overhearing".

The show's weekly format includes discussion of games played over the weekend, industry news, recently released games, and e-mails sent in by listeners. The site's staff have also recorded shows in Tokyo, Japan for the Tokyo Game Show, as well as during the Electronic Entertainment Expo and the Penny Arcade Expo. In 2011 the podcast was said to have over 100,000 listeners. Beginning in July 2016, Giant Bomb began live-streaming the recording of the Giant Bombcast in video format.

Giant Beastcast
In June 2015, Giant Bomb premiered a second weekly podcast, the Giant Beastcast. Released every Friday, the show was recorded in Giant Bombs New York office and was hosted by Caravella, with weekly guests during its tenure including Navarro, Bakalar, Walker, Ryckert, and Russell. The show followed a similar format to the Giant Bombcast. The podcast was retired in May 2021 following the closure of the New York office and the departure of Caravella and Navarro, concluding with its 331st episode featuring all six hosts.

News
Giant Bombs news was written by news editors Navarro and Klepek. Articles produced aren't limited to general gaming news, but also include investigative journalistic pieces about the industry, such as the controversy surrounding the developers of LA Noire, Team Bondi, and its work practices. Editorials and interviews written by Klepek during his tenure about gaming ethics, experiences and impact include the story of one person who detailed the mental processes of Asperger syndrome and how his time playing video games differs from the average gamer. An article in July 2011 about the world travel-influenced game creation concept, Game Trekking, featured an interview with founder Jordan Magnuson and his "notgame", The Killer. The Killer was based on his travels in Cambodia and his observations of a nation still recovering from its time as the Democratic Kampuchea under the Khmer Rouge regime, led by Pol Pot from 1975 to 1979. Following the 2011 Evo Championship Series in which Rising Star award winner, 8 year-old Noah Solis made the top 48 players in Marvel vs. Capcom 3: Fate of Two Worlds, Klepek interviewed Solis and his father Moises Solis who praised video games alongside education in avoiding Los Angeles organized crime.

In 2013 Microsoft unveiled their eighth generation video game console, the Xbox One. The Xbox One's pre-release reception was subject to strong criticism following its announcement of functionalities such as the always-on form of digital rights management (DRM), barring consumers from playing purchased games if their Xbox One could not connect to the internet once every 24 hours. On June 19, 2013, Giant Bomb broke the story that Microsoft would reverse these policies and not feature them in the console. After Klepek's article, Microsoft announced the changes later that day.

Reviews
Video games on Giant Bomb are rated on a scale of one to five stars, with no half-stars. Metacritic lists Giant Bomb as having over 830 reviews in its records, with more than 450 of them positive, more than 250 being mixed and over 100 of them being negative. Of those reviews, 30% are higher than the average critic, 3% the same and 67% are lower. In contrast to their time working for GameSpot, Davis had said that reviews are not representative of Giant Bomb as an entity but are very personalised saying that, "as far as the review process goes, we're being very open about a review being that person's perspective. When a review has to represent an entire organization's perspective on a game, that's where you can run into trouble." During a video game reviews conference on Rock, Paper, Shotgun in 2008, Gerstmann outlined his approach to reviews. Emphasizing the idea of reviews now being more subjective and less objective from the seventh generation video game consoles onwards, due to the audience of video games and video game culture becoming more widespread, Gerstmann said that assisting readers on a given game rather than giving a definite view of it is the direction in which video game reviews are moving towards.

Game of the year awards

The annual game of the year awards features multiple podcasts which are live-recordings of the staff's deliberations. Additional comical awards created by Giant Bomb has included the Best Use of Nolan North, otherwise known as The Northies, an award North himself acknowledged. During the awards week, individual top 10 games of the year are posted from each staff member. Celebrity top 10 guest game of the year articles from outside of the video game industry include horror and science fiction film director John Carpenter and WWE professional wrestlers Stardust and Xavier Woods.

Community content

Users on Giant Bomb have the ability to create blogs, keep track of their game collections, and add information to game entries. Additionally, the site has message boards, saying that "building a community of people ... is a big part of what Giant Bomb is all about". Giant Bomb allows users to contribute to collaborative wiki-based game guides. In Quests users earned experience points and level up in a social gaming element that, "give users incentives to create more content".

Wiki-database
The Giant Bomb video game wiki-database, which opened with the full site launched in July 2008, combines a structured wiki with a relational database and is editable by registered users of the site. Submissions are approved by appointed wiki moderators before being accepted, but experienced users may forgo this process. The wiki's design has been described as built around the interactivity of video games in contrast to existing wiki models. TechCrunch compares the wiki-database to Wetpaint, Engadget, and its own Crunchbase, which was based on a predecessor of Giant Bomb, Whiskey Media's now retired website Political Base. Ernest W. Adams credited the wiki-database for its use during his research for the writing of his book Fundamentals of Game Design.

Paid subscription service
Giant Bombs paid subscription service launched in September 2010, featuring additional videos, livestreams, and ad-free podcasts exclusive to premium members. In June 2011, Whiskey Media's Mike Tatum reported that they were nearing 10,000 premium members. The paid subscription model has become Giant Bombs primary source of income in the wake of ad filtering services such as Adblock Plus. In addition to video games, subscription content features other industries including professional wrestling, Formula 1, music, and culture podcasts.

Corporate affairs and culture
Giant Bomb is known for its alternate method of video game journalism, described as, "not looking to take over the world, they've got a very small editorial team that's very focused on covering the things they want covered and that's it." This concept is based on focused, personalized coverage and giving the byline added importance as opposed to the accepted industry coverage that generally existed prior. Gerstmann has described their approach of competing with large established gaming websites as focusing on the top percentage of games editorially while functioning in a curator role to direct users to lesser known games through video features and the wiki-database pages.

Timeline

Jeff Gerstmann 

Working for GameSpot as editorial director until 2007, Gerstmann, GameSpot and its parent company CNET were involved in a controversial incident when Gerstmann was fired for what was later revealed to be a stand off between GameSpot editorial and management teams. Gerstmann would join Whiskey Media and launch Giant Bomb with Davis, Shoemaker and Caravella in 2008. Gerstmann is one of the members of the VGX awards advisory council responsible for nominating and deciding on winners. Gerstmann was fired from the site in June 2022.

Ryan Davis 

Ryan Thomas "Taswell" Davis (June 4, 1979 – July 3, 2013) was an American video game journalist and Internet personality.  He was formerly a journalist of the gaming website GameSpot and the co-founder and editor of the gaming website Giant Bomb.

Recruited by Jeff Gerstmann, Davis began working for GameSpot in 2000. Initially starting in tech support work, Davis joined the editorial team, writing reviews for the website, eventually becoming involved in its video and podcast content.

After the dismissal of Gerstmann in 2007, Davis departed GameSpot and joined Gerstmann under Whiskey Media to launch Giant Bomb. Becoming the primary host of Giant Bomb, Davis was the host of the Giant Bombcast as well as video content. Davis was described as having an ability to connect with viewers due to an "inherently genuine" on-screen presence.

Davis died on July 3, 2013, of natural causes, shortly after his wedding to Anna Davis. His death was revealed five days later on the Giant Bomb website. In addition to
Anna Davis, Davis is survived by his father Richard Davis, mother Rebecca Davis, stepmother Anne Davis, brother Robin Davis and uncle Ron Felkner.

Co-worker Matthew Rorie said of Davis that, "for someone who could be so acerbic at times, and despite knowing him for almost a decade, I honestly don’t recall ever actually being mad at him. He had an unconventional type of kindness that expressed itself more strongly the longer one knew him, and despite his teasing nature, he always managed to make his close friends feel loved when his attention turned towards you."

Business practices, ethics and associations
The website had several interactions with Buckner & Garcia, creators of "Pac-Man Fever", in 2011 starting in June when Giant Bomb ran an in-office Pac-Man tournament on Thursday Night Throwdown. The show featured an interview with Jerry Buckner and Gary Garcia who were promoting their first set of Pac-Man Fever songs releasing on the Rock Band Network. Davis would later joke about wanting "Buckner & Garcia to write a song about this stupid website", the following week on the Giant Bombcast. "Found me the Bomb", written and performed by Buckner and Garcia, would release as a new track with the 2nd set of Pac-Man Fever songs in September. This would be the final song the duo would create with the death of Gary Garcia on November 17, 2011.

January 18, 2012, was the Protests against SOPA and PIPA, a collective effort against the Stop Online Piracy Act and PROTECT IP Act. Many websites including the English Wikipedia went on a 24-hour-long blackout against the two proposed laws. Giant Bomb was also in opposition against SOPA and PIPA and ran an impromptu comedy show that day.

Molyjam was a worldwide 48-hour game jam in March through to April 2012, founded by Double Fine Productions' Anna Kipnis, Giant Bombs Patrick Klepek and Idle Thumbs' Chris Remo. Based on a parody account of known video game developer Peter Molyneux on Twitter, both professional and amateur game designers and developers in over 30 cities created games based on the parody account's comedic "emotional" and "innovative" tweets. Kipnis, Klepek and Remo ran the main game jam at the Giant Bomb and GameSpot CBS Interactive offices in San Francisco.

Alex Navarro made an appearance at the 2015 Awesome Games Done Quick (AGDQ) charity event. Navarro did a speedrun of the 2003 video game Big Rigs: Over the Road Racing, a game he reviewed for GameSpot in 2004, giving it the first 1/10 review in GameSpot history.

Humor

In October 2014 Giant Bomb released a video in which Gerstmann and Ryckert held a video game competition to see who could get the furthest in the video game Super Mario Bros. 3 while riding the Medusa roller coaster at Six Flags Discovery Kingdom in Vallejo, California. Each player had a Nintendo 3DS strapped to their wrist and played the game via Nintendo's Virtual Console service while experiencing the roller coaster's inversions and g-force. Ryckert introduced strict rules to the proceedings, banning the use of the game's hidden items, the warp whistles, as well as declaring that neither of them could continue to play the game if the roller coaster was not moving. In keeping with the comedic nature of the video, The A.V. Club commented on the efforts of Ryckert and Gerstmann during the competition by quoting the 35th President of the United States, John F. Kennedy's We choose to go to the Moon speech, saying "[We do these things] not because they are easy, but because they are hard."

Charity work
Giant Bomb participates in the annual charity event Extra Life, in which fundraisers stream 24-hour video game marathons while viewers donate for sick children. After raising a cumulative total of $122,972 in 2013 the Giant Bomb team, consisting of the Giant Bomb staff, Iron Galaxy Studios and community members, passed its set goal of $175,000 in 2014. The primary channels of Giant Bomb and Iron Galaxy featured four separate 24-hour streams adding up to a total of 96 hours that week. As of June 2017 the Giant Bomb Extra Life team had raised $923,797.

Reception
In voting the website into its Top 50 websites of 2011, Harry McCracken of Time magazine described Giant Bomb as having, "news, reviews and video — all looser, funnier and more opinionated than much of the stuff on game sites owned by larger media companies."
In January 2012 it was announced that Vox Media had hired several names from gaming journalism to launch Polygon including Editor-in-Chiefs of Joystiq and Kotaku, Chris Grant and Brian Crecente. When asked why he thought there was room for another video game website, Grant said that, "The only site I would really look at and say they have enviable technology is Giant Bomb; nothing else out there has anything that's really attractive."

Criticisms and controversies
Critics including Brianna Wu and writer Samantha Allen lamented Giant Bombs hiring of Dan Ryckert and Jason Oestreicher in July 2014 regarding gender representation in video games and other minority groups, citing Giant Bombs 100% white, male staff personnel. Allen received harassment via Twitter. In October 2014 in an op-ed for XoJane regarding the Gamergate harassment campaign, Wu described Allen's harassment as carried out by the same people behind the Gamergate-related video game sexual harassment with the same "playbook" of political strategy tactics as herself, Zoë Quinn and Anita Sarkeesian had experienced.

During an interview with MSNBC on MSNBC Live, Wu called upon Giant Bomb and IGN to provide coverage of Gamergate on its website. An article by Patrick Klepek detailing Wu's Gamergate-related harassment was posted that day, as acknowledged by the BBC on its BBC Online service in their coverage of Gamergate and Wu herself in a subsequent interview with PBS's PBS NewsHour.

Impact

Giant Bomb is credited with being an innovator within video game journalism, avoiding many of its downfalls and continuing growth where other companies in the medium have had to downsize or close down completely. Due to ad filtering, the advertisements that have been common in video game journalism websites are becoming less viable. Websites such as Giant Bomb, ScrewAttack, and Penny-Arcade have received praise for their success in their paid subscription models. In addition, as print-based gaming journalism was superseded by web-based gaming journalism, large gaming journalism websites such as IGN and GameSpot are now under threat from YouTube celebrities and video game players creating their own live-streaming channels on Twitch.

References

External links
 

2008 establishments in the United States
American blogs
Fandom (website)
Former CBS Interactive websites
Internet properties established in 2008
Video game Internet forums
Video game news websites
Video game podcasts
Wikis
2020 mergers and acquisitions
2022 mergers and acquisitions